Umran Malik (born 22 November 1999) is an Indian international cricketer who plays for Indian cricket team in limited-overs cricket. Considered as one of the fastest bowler in contemporary world, Umran plays as a right-arm fast bowler for Sunrisers Hyderabad in Indian Premier League and Jammu and Kashmir in domestic cricket.

Early life 
He was born to Abdul Rashid, a fruit-seller in Shaheedi Chowk and Seema Begum, in Gujjar Nagar in Jammu.

Career
In April 2021, Malik was selected as one of three net bowlers for 2021 Indian Premier League (IPL) playing for Sunrisers Hyderabad. On 3 October 2021, he made his debut in the IPL, against Kolkata Knight Riders, during the 49th match of 2021 Indian Premier League. He gained attention during the match between Sunrisers Hyderabad and Royal Challengers Bangalore, when he bowled five balls in a row at more than 150 kmph. As a result of his fast-bowling, he was named as a net bowler for India's team for the 2021 ICC Men's T20 World Cup. He made his first-class debut on 23 November 2021, for India A against South Africa A.

He was retained by Sunrisers Hyderabad in the IPL 2022 auction. On 27 April 2022, in the 2022 Indian Premier League match against the Gujarat Titans, Malik took his first five-wicket haul in Twenty20 cricket. Malik was also named as the Emerging Player of the tournament.

In May 2022, Malik was named in India's Twenty20 International (T20I) squad for their series against South Africa. The following month, he was named in India's T20I squad for their two-match series against Ireland. He made his T20I debut on 26 June 2022, for India against Ireland. His first ODI debut for the India cricket team in November 2022 against New Zealand. He dismissed Devon Conway as his first wicket.

Records 

 In January 2023, Malik clocked 155kmph in his 17th over in (T20I) at Wankhede Stadium Mumbai against Sri Lanka. He broke the record of Jasprit Bumrah for the fastest ball bowled by an Indian.He also clocked 157kmph in a IPL 2022 match against Chennai Super Kings at Pune.

References

External links
 

1999 births
Living people
Indian people of Kashmiri descent
Indian cricketers
India Twenty20 International cricketers
Jammu and Kashmir cricketers
Sunrisers Hyderabad cricketers
People from Jammu